The 2014 Texas A&M Aggies women's soccer team represents Texas A&M University in the 2014 NCAA Division I women's college soccer season. The Aggies are led by G. Guerrieri, who has coached the team since the program's inception in 1993 (22 years). The 2014 team was the first squad in school history to reach the College Cup, eventually losing to the Virginia Cavaliers 3-1 in the national semifinals.

The 2014 team has 22 roster players, with 14 scholarships to utilize between them.

2014 schedule

Season review

Non-conference

Conference

NCAA tournament

Lineup/formation
4–3–3 shown
Mouseover names for stats

Roster/statistics
Starters highlighted in green

Accolades/notes

References

External links

Official website

Texas A&M Aggies women's soccer seasons
Texas AandM